The 1906 Cockermouth by-election was a by-election held on 3 August 1906 for the British House of Commons constituency of Cockermouth.

Vacancy
The by-election was triggered by the death of the town's Liberal Member of Parliament (MP) Sir Wilfrid Lawson.

Electoral history
At the last General Election in January, the result was;

Candidates
The Liberal candidate chosen to defend the seat was Captain Frederick Guest. Thirty-one-year-old Guest was a former Conservative who had followed his cousin Winston Churchill, for whom he worked as private secretary, into the Liberal Party in 1904 in support of the policy of Free trade. At the previous General Election in January, he was Liberal candidate for Kingswinford where he came second.

The Conservative candidate was Sir John Randles, who had held the seat from 1900 until losing narrowly in the general election in January. Forty-eight-year-old Randles was an industrialist in the coal and steel business.

There was also a third candidate, Robert Smillie of the Independent Labour Party. Forty-nine-year-old Smillie, in 1893 was a founding member of the Independent Labour Party. He had been President of the Scottish Miners' Federation since 1894. He had stood unsuccessfully for parliament on a number of occasions since 1894. At the previous General Election in January, he was Labour candidate for Paisley when he came third.

Campaign

Result
Turnout was only slightly down since the general election, when only two candidates had run, and although the Conservative vote fell slightly, the Liberals lost much more, probably due to the intervention of Smillie. The result was a gain for the Conservatives.

Aftermath
Randles held the seat at the following General Election;

Sir John Randles lost the seat again in the December 1910 election, this time to Sir Wilfred Lawson, son of the former MP. Frederick Guest was eventually returned as a Member of Parliament for East Dorset in the January 1910 general election.

See also 
 List of United Kingdom by-elections
 Cockermouth constituency

References 

 The Times, July/August 1906

Cockermouth by-election
Cockermouth by-election
Cockermouth by-election
20th century in Cumberland
By-elections to the Parliament of the United Kingdom in Cumbria constituencies